Zlatko Dedić (born 5 October 1984) is a retired Slovenian footballer who played as a forward. Besides Slovenia, he has played in Italy, Germany, and Austria.

Club career

Dedić started his career with Koper. As a former Parma player, he was loaned out to Serie B clubs Empoli in 2004–05 season and Cremonese in the second half of the 2005–06 season. He made his Serie A debut on 21 September 2005 against Roma. He left for Frosinone of Serie B in January 2007 in co-ownership deal.

In January 2008, he was loaned to Piacenza of Serie B and was given the number 9 shirt from Daniele Cacia, who had left for Fiorentina. On 25 June 2008 Frosinone acquired Dedić outright from Parma.

 In August 2011 he was loaned for one year to Dynamo Dresden.

International career
Dedić made his debut for Slovenia on 18 August 2004 in a friendly match against Serbia and Montenegro coming in as a substitute in 67th minute. He scored his first goal against Poland on 6 September 2008, in a 2010 World Cup qualification match. He was later instrumental in his national team's successful qualification to the 2010 World Cup by scoring the winning goal in the second leg playoff match against Russia, which ended 1–0.

Personal life
Dedić was born in Bihać, present day Bosnia and Herzegovina, and moved to Slovenia at a very young age where he spent his childhood in the village of Podgorje, near Koper, in the Slovenian Littoral.

Career statistics

Club

International 
Scores and results list Slovenia's goal tally first, score column indicates score after each Dedić goal.

References

External links

 Zlatko Dedić at NZS 
 
 
 
 

1984 births
Living people
People from Bihać
Slovenian people of Bosnia and Herzegovina descent
Slovenian footballers
Association football forwards
Slovenian expatriate footballers
Slovenian PrvaLiga players
Serie A players
Serie B players
Bundesliga players
2. Bundesliga players
3. Liga players
2. Liga (Austria) players
Austrian Football Bundesliga players
FC Koper players
Parma Calcio 1913 players
Empoli F.C. players
U.S. Cremonese players
Piacenza Calcio 1919 players
Frosinone Calcio players
VfL Bochum players
Dynamo Dresden players
FSV Frankfurt players
SC Paderborn 07 players
FC Wacker Innsbruck (2002) players
WSG Tirol players
Expatriate footballers in Italy
Expatriate footballers in Germany
Expatriate footballers in Austria
Slovenian expatriate sportspeople in Italy
Slovenian expatriate sportspeople in Germany
Slovenian expatriate sportspeople in Austria
2010 FIFA World Cup players
Slovenia youth international footballers
Slovenia under-21 international footballers
Slovenia international footballers